Leila Niño (born 23 October 1992) is an Argentine handball player for Club Atlético River Plate and the Argentine national team.

She represented Argentina at the 2019 World Women's Handball Championship.

References

1992 births
Living people
Argentine female handball players
21st-century Argentine women
South American Games bronze medalists for Argentina
South American Games medalists in handball
Competitors at the 2022 South American Games